The Escape to Nice is a 1932 German comedy crime film directed by James Bauer and starring Fritz Fischer, Georg Alexander and Else Elster. The film is based on the novel Orje Lehmann wird Detektiv by Dolly Bruck (Hans Mahner-Mons). It was shot at the Halensee Studios in Berlin and on location in London and Nice. The film's sets were designed by the art director Franz Schroedter. It premiered on 14 June 1932.

Cast
 Fritz Fischer as Hugo Lehmann
 Georg Alexander as Fritz Butenschön
 Else Elster as Irene Dippel
 Gerhard Dammann as Ihr Vater
 Betty Bird as Ramona Novalez
 Hedwig Wangel as Ramonas Mutter
 Max Gülstorff as Kommissar Grimm
 Egon Brosig as Herr Harnisch
 Theo Lingen as Herr Bock
 Hermann Picha as Herr Fiedler
 Philipp Manning as Der Inspektor
 Angelo Ferrari
 Erich Fiedler
 Gerti Ober
 Hans Ritter
 Alexandra Schmitt
 Lotte Steinhoff

References

Bibliography

External links

1932 films
Films of the Weimar Republic
1930s crime comedy films
German crime comedy films
1930s German-language films
Films directed by James Bauer
Films set in Italy
Films based on German novels
German black-and-white films
1932 comedy films
1930s German films
Films shot at Halensee Studios
Films shot in London
Films shot in Nice